Nolinoideae is a monocot subfamily of the family Asparagaceae in the APG III system of 2009. It used to be treated as a separate family, Ruscaceae s.l. The family name is derived from the generic name of the type genus, Nolina.

The subfamily includes genera that had been placed in a range of different families, including Ruscaceae s.s., Nolinaceae, Dracaenaceae, Convallariaceae and Eriospermaceae. Like many groups of lilioid monocots, the genera included here were once included in a wide interpretation of the family Liliaceae.

Genera
A possibly incomplete list of the genera included in the Nolinoideae is given below. The reference is to the source which places the genus in this subfamily. The genera included here have varied widely in their limits and assignment to families and subfamilies; some former family placements other than Nolinoideae (which will be found in the literature) are given below.

References

External links

 Convallariaceae, Dracaenaceae, Eriospermaceae, Nolinaceae, Ruscaceae in L. Watson and M.J. Dallwitz (1992 onwards). The families of flowering plants: descriptions, illustrations, identification, information retrieval. Version: 3 May 2006. http://delta-intkey.com
 Liliaceae in Flora of North America
 NCBI Taxonomy Browser
 links, links, links,  linkslinks at CSDL, Texas

 
Asparagales subfamilies